Events from the year 2016 in the British Virgin Islands.

Incumbents
Governor: John Duncan
Premier: Orlando Smith

Events

January
 1 January 2016 - The National Health Insurance scheme comes into effect.
 12 January 2016 - Government announces a controversial $7 million investment in startup BVI Airways.
 20 January 2016 - The inaugural Virgin Islands General Legal Council is appointed, headed by Dancia Penn QC.
 25 January 2016 - Minister of Works Mark Vanterpool announces that the public pier park project was cost $85 million, more than double the original budget of $35 million.

March
 19 March 2016 - The BVI is affected by a magnitude 6.0 earthquake.  No major damage is reported.

April
 3 April 2016 - The Panama Papers are published, revealing the previously confidential beneficial owners of a large number of companies incorporated in the Territory.

June
 23 June 2016 - The House of Assembly adopts the Virgin Islands pledge.

July
 22 July 2016 - It is announced that Elinah Phillip will represent the British Virgin Islands at the 2016 Summer Olympics, the first time a swimmer has represented the Territory at the games.
 31 July 2016 - Gunfire was shot at or near to the Premier's vehicle; the Premier, Orlando Smith, was not in the vehicle at the time.

August

 22 August 2016 - Billionaire BVI resident Sir Richard Branson is injured in a serious cycling accident on Virgin Gorda.
 25 August 2016 - Five cases of the Zika virus are confirmed in the Territory as part of a wider global outbreak.

September
 29 September 2016 - Former Premier Ralph O'Neal suffers a stroke.

October
 1 October 2016 - The minimum wage raised from $4 an hour to $6 an hour.
 17 October 2016 - The Judicial Committee of the Privy Council rules against HM Customs in a long running dispute with Delta Petroleum.

November
 28 November 2016 - The National Health Insurance scheme suspends benefits for over 1,000 workers because of their employer's failure to pay contributions.  This action is subsequently agreed to be unlawful.

December
 27 December 2016 - Government awards the contract for the expansion of Terrance B. Lettsome International Airport to China Communications Construction Company for US$153,432,572.10.  It is the largest government contract awarded in the Territory's history, and concerns are expressed about the company's bidding practices.

Footnotes

 
2010s in the British Virgin Islands
British Virgin Islands